Christ Church Mission, also known as the Anvik Mission, is a historic Episcopal church mission in Anvik, Alaska. There are four buildings that survive from what was once a larger complex. The largest is the main mission building, is a  structure built in 1932. The oldest building is the church, which was built in 1892, and was moved to the present site when river erosion threatened the previous one.

The mission site was added to the National Register of Historic Places in 1980.

See also
National Register of Historic Places listings in Yukon–Koyukuk Census Area, Alaska

References

Episcopal church buildings in Alaska
Buildings and structures on the National Register of Historic Places in Yukon–Koyukuk Census Area, Alaska
Native American history of Alaska
Churches on the National Register of Historic Places in Alaska
Churches completed in 1892
Yukon River